Pere Pons Riera (born 20 February 1993) is a Spanish professional footballer who plays as a defensive midfielder for Cypriot club AEK Larnaca FC.

Club career

Girona
Born in Sant Martí Vell, Girona, Catalonia, Pons joined Girona FC's youth setup in 2002, aged nine. He started his senior career with the reserves in the regional leagues, in 2012.

On 13 September 2012, Pons made his first-team debut, coming on as a second-half substitute for Joseba Garmendia in a 2–0 away loss against Sporting de Gijón in the second round of the Copa del Rey. He first appeared in Segunda División three days later, again replacing Garmendia in the 5–0 home rout of UD Las Palmas.

Pons scored his first professional goal on 6 October 2013, the first in a 1–1 home draw against CE Sabadell FC. On 29 January 2014, he was loaned to Segunda División B side UE Olot until June. He subsequently returned to the Albirrojos in the summer, and was made first choice by manager Pablo Machín.

On 21 November 2014, Pons renewed his contract with the club, signing until 2017. He contributed two goals in 38 matches during the 2016–17 campaign, in a first-ever promotion to La Liga.

Pons agreed to an extension on 15 August 2017, until 2020. He made his debut in the top flight four days later, starting in a 2–2 home draw with Atlético Madrid.

Alavés
On 4 July 2019, after suffering relegation, Pons signed a three-year contract with Deportivo Alavés still in the top tier.

International career
On 28 December 2016, Pons made his debut for the Catalonia national team, coming on as a half-time substitute for Sergi Roberto in a 3–3 draw against Tunisia (2–4 penalty loss).

Career statistics

References

External links

1993 births
Living people
People from Gironès
Sportspeople from the Province of Girona
Spanish footballers
Footballers from Catalonia
Association football midfielders
La Liga players
Segunda División players
Segunda División B players
Divisiones Regionales de Fútbol players
Girona FC B players
Girona FC players
UE Olot players
Deportivo Alavés players
Cypriot First Division players
AEK Larnaca FC players
Catalonia international footballers
Spanish expatriate footballers
Expatriate footballers in Cyprus
Spanish expatriate sportspeople in Cyprus